Area code 432 is a telephone area code in the North American Numbering Plan (NANP) for the U.S. state of Texas in the Permian Basin and Trans-Pecos areas (excluding the El Paso metropolitan area), including the cities of Midland, Odessa, and Alpine. It was created, along with area code 325, on  April 5, 2003 in a split of numbering plan area (NPA) 915.

Service area
Counties:
Andrews, Brewster, Crane, Culberson, Ector, Gaines, Glasscock, Howard, Jeff Davis, Loving, Martin, Midland, Pecos, Presidio, Reeves, Terrell, Upton, Val Verde, Ward, and Winkler

Towns and cities: 
Ackerly, Alpine, Andrews, Balmorhea, Big Bend National Park, Big Spring, Coahoma, Comstock, Coyanosa, Crane, Dryden, Forsan, Fort Davis, Fort Stockton, Garden City, Gardendale, Goldsmith, Grandfalls, Imperial, Iraan, Kermit, Lenorah, Marathon, Marfa, McCamey, Midkiff, Midland, Monahans, Odessa, Pecos, Presidio, Pyote, Rankin, Sanderson, Seminole, Stanton, Terlingua, Toyahvale, Valentine, Van Horn and  Wink

See also
List of Texas area codes

External links

432
432
 Midland County, Texas
 Ector County, Texas